A monocline (or, rarely, a monoform) is a step-like fold in rock strata consisting of a zone of steeper dip within an otherwise horizontal or gently-dipping sequence.

Formation

Monoclines may be formed in several different ways (see diagram)

 By differential compaction over an underlying structure, particularly a large fault at the edge of a basin due to the greater compactibility of the basin fill, the amplitude of the fold will die out gradually upwards.
  By mild reactivation of an earlier extensional fault during a phase of inversion causing folding in the overlying sequence.
  As a form of fault propagation fold during upward propagation of an extensional fault in basement into an overlying cover sequence.
  As a form of fault propagation fold during upward propagation of a reverse fault in basement into an overlying cover sequence.

Examples
 Waterpocket Fold in Capitol Reef National Park, Utah
Comb Ridge in southern Utah
 Grandview-Phantom Monocline in  Grand Canyon, Arizona
 Grand Hogback in Colorado
 Lebombo Mountains in Southern Africa
 Lapstone Monocline in the Blue Mountains (Australia)
 Beaumaris Monocline in Victoria (Australia)
 Purbeck Monocline on the Isle of Purbeck, Dorset, England
 Fore-Sudetic Monocline, Poland
 Sindh Monocline, Pakistan
 Torres Flexure, southern Brazil

See also
Anticline
Homocline
Syncline

References

Structural geology
Deformation (mechanics)